Félicien Dumas (born 29 December 1996) is a French footballer player.

Career

Youth 
Dumas was born in Paris, but spent time in Tokyo and Singapore growing up. He played with Home United and Hong Kong FC during his time in Asia, and earned trials with Newcastle United and Kashiwa Reysol.

University of Notre Dame
In 2015, Dumas attended the University of Notre Dame to play college soccer. He redshirted his freshman year and began play in 2016, where he went on to play for the Fighting Irish for four years. During his time at Notre Dame, Dumas made 56 appearances, scoring 7 goals and tallying 17 assists, and was a two-time ACC Defensive Player of the Week in 2019

Chicago FC United
While at college, Dumas also appeared for USL League Two side Chicago FC United in 2019.

MLS SuperDraft
On 9 January 2020, Dumas was selected 48th overall in the 2020 MLS SuperDraft by New York City FC. He appeared for the club in their pre-season Florida Cup, including in a fixture against Brazilian club Corinthians, he did not sign with the club.

Indy Eleven 
On 17 June 2020, Dumas signed with USL Championship side Indy Eleven. He made his professional debut on 26 July 2020, appearing as an 81st-minute substitute during a 1–0 loss to Saint Louis FC.

References

External links 
 Felicien Dumas Notre Dame bio
 

1996 births
Living people
French footballers
Association football defenders
Chicago FC United players
Expatriate soccer players in the United States
French expatriate footballers
French expatriate sportspeople in the United States
Indy Eleven players
New York City FC draft picks
Notre Dame Fighting Irish men's soccer players
Footballers from Paris
Association football people from Tokyo
USL Championship players
USL League Two players